Francis Joseph (Joe) Chithalen (November 17, 1967 – May 1, 1999) was a Canadian musician. He was a bassist for a number of bands in the Kingston music scene of the 1990s, most notably Weeping Tile, The Mahones, Bucket, and Wild Blues Yonder.

On May 1, 1999, Chithalen died in Amsterdam shortly after a Mahones concert, said to be from ingesting food containing peanuts. His former Weeping Tile bandmate Sarah Harmer wrote "You Were Here", the title track from her 2000 solo album, in memory of Chithalen.

After his death, The Joe Chithalen Memorial Musical Instrument Lending Library (JOE'S M.I.L.L.) was established in Kingston, Ontario by some of his friends, family and past bandmates (including the late Wally High). The Library loans instruments to aspiring musicians who can't afford them. Some of Chithalen's own bass guitars and other stringed instruments sit in the lending Library, and are occasionally loaned out for performances.

1967 births
1999 deaths
Canadian rock bass guitarists
Musicians from Kingston, Ontario
Canadian alternative rock musicians
Alternative rock bass guitarists
20th-century Canadian guitarists